The Indochina Campaign commemorative medal was a French military decoration established on 1 August 1953 by decree 53-722 to recognize participation in the Indochina War by the members of the French Far East Expeditionary Corps, regular and reserve.

History
The conflict in French Indochina started right after the end of World War II with the French forces initially under the command of general Philippe Leclerc.  During the first eight years of the conflict, French and colonial troops received the Colonial Medal with the "EXTRÊME-ORIENT" clasp, unfortunately, this award couldn't be earned by all in theater and outright excluded indigenous personnel.  Politicians and generals alike petitioned the government for a dedicated commemorative award available to all participants under French command.

Even after the award was established, French soldiers still received the Colonial Medal with "EXTRÊME-ORIENT" clasp in addition to the Indochina Campaign commemorative medal.

Statute
The Indochina Campaign commemorative medal was awarded to soldiers of the army, navy and air force involved, for a minimum of ninety days, in a regular or supplementary unit in the Indochina campaign between 16 August 1945 and  11 August 1954.

The medal could also be awarded to civilians, citizens of France or of the French Union, members of the Merchant navy or civil aviation, on board ships or as part of aircrews of air navigation aircraft, having ensured for a minimum period of ninety consecutive days, between the same aforementioned dates, troop or military equipment transport to or within Indochina.

The ninety-day minimum period of service in theater was waived for personnel injured during operations in theater or mentioned in dispatches during the campaign.

Description
The Indochina Campaign commemorative medal was a 36mm in diameter circular medal struck from bronze.  On its obverse at lower center, a 24mm wide by 5mm high rectangular panel bearing the relief inscription "INDOCHINE" supported by a seven headed naja, five of its heads being below the panel, two being above the upper corners, one on each side.  Atop the panel, a three headed elephant surrounded by the relief semi circular inscription "RÉPUBLIQUE FRANÇAISE" along the medal circumference.

On the reverse in relief, a 25mm in diameter wreath of laurels and oak leaves surrounded by the inscription "CORPS EXPÉDITIONNAIRE FRANÇAIS D'EXTRÊME-ORIENT" running along the entire medal circumference.

The ribbon suspension ring was adorned with a 20mm high by 25mm wide bronze twisted dragon.  The ring passed through a loop atop the medal which hung from a 39mm wide green ribbon bearing four 5mm wide yellow stripes set 5mm apart starting 2mm from the edges.

Notable recipients 
General Marcel Alessandri
Surgeon General Valérie André
Lieutenant Paul Brunbrouck
Admiral Georges Cabanier
General Paul Arnaud de Foïard
General Paul Arnault
General Marcel Bigeard
Major Rudolf Eggs
Master sergeant Marc Flament
Lieutenant colonel Albert Fossey-François
Lieutenant colonel Jules Gaucher
General Maurice Henry
Colonial Aloyse Rodolphe Kennel
General Pierre Langlais
General Paul Lardry
General Philippe Leclerc de Hauteclocque
General Renaud de Corta
Major Hélie de Saint Marc
General Raoul Salan
Major René de Salins
General Maurice Schmitt
Chief warrant officer Jo Sohet
Lieutenant colonel Léo Vidou
General Pierre Vincent

See also

 Tonkin Expedition commemorative medal: French campaign medal for the Tonkin campaign

References

External links
 Museum of the Legion of Honour (in French)

Military awards and decorations of France
Awards established in 1953
1953 establishments in France
French campaign medals
First Indochina War